Gustavo Silva may refer to:

 Gustavo Silva Pizarro (1884–1960), Chilean lawyer, political scientist and mayor
 Gustavo Silva Conceição (born 1986), Brazilian footballer
 Gustavo Silva (footballer) (born 1997), Brazilian footballer
 Gustavo Henrique Silva (born 1979), Brazilian handball player